Mariusz Fyrstenberg and Marcin Matkowski were the defending champions but chose not to participate this year.
Łukasz Kubot and Édouard Roger-Vasselin won the title, defeating Pierre-Hugues Herbert and Nicolas Mahut in the final, 2–6, 6–3, [10–7].

Seeds

Draw

Draw

References
 Main Draw

Doubles